Agisoft Metashape (previously known as Agisoft PhotoScan) is a tool for a photogrammetry pipeline. The software is available in Standard and Pro versions, the standard version is sufficient for interactive media tasks, while the Pro version is designed for authoring GIS content.
The software is developed by Agisoft LLC located in St. Petersburg in Russia.

It is widely used by archaeologists.
Many UAV companies are also using it.

The software can run on any of these operating systems: Microsoft Windows, macOS or Linux.

Use in industry

References

External links 

  

Photogrammetry software
Software companies of Russia